The following is a complete list of Old Dominion Monarchs men's basketball seasons for Old Dominion University.

Seasons

References

 
Old Dominion
Old Dominion Monarchs basketball seasons